Founded in 2015 at Stanford University, California by Dr. Margot Gerritsen and Karen Matthys, the Women in Data Science Initiative (WiDs) encourages women from around the world to connect with one another, to form local and regional networks, and to promote an inclusive and diverse community within the rapidly expanding field of data science.

From problems with facial recognition technologies that do not recognize darker-skinned faces to predictive policing algorithms that misidentify threats and intensify surveillance in communities of color, the effects of the lack of diversity in data science are numerous. Biased data sets may result in additional forms of discrimination. When an early attempt to design a computer program to help with hiring decisions relied mainly on resumes from men, the program "taught itself that male candidates were preferable to women." While Amazon immediately recognized this tendency and never used the program to evaluate job candidates, this example shows that relying on biased data may perpetuate inequalities. According to Gerritsen, “We cannot let these algorithms and these approaches of data-driven decision making really play the significant role that they are starting to play in our society at large if we do not really understand the ethics.” 

WiDs holds an annual Women in Data Science Worldwide conference annually, held as a 24-hour virtual event in 2021, is intended to inspire, educate, and sustain data science worldwide. In 2020, over 30,000 people participated, from 50 different countries.  WiDs has reached over 100,000 women around the world. The Pune, India chapter of WiDs, for example, has over 5,000 members. Sucheta Dhere, ambassador of the WiDs Pune Chapter noted that computer vision, natural language processing, and machine learning "have a huge hiring potential in India," particularly for women. In 2019, more than 250 women convened in Madrid for the WIDS conference, which brought together women working on artificial intelligence and robotics. The Cambridge WiDS event was held at the Massachusetts Institute of Technology in 2020. Its signature event was a panel discussion on data science and fake news called “Data weaponized, data scrutinized: a war on information.”  

The Women in Data Science initiative also runs workshops on topics ranging from actionable ethics, automating machine learning, data analysis for health, and exploring artificial intelligence.

References

Stanford University
Facial recognition software
Diversity in computing